Celebrity Bromance is a South Korean variety show  broadcast on MBig TV , available to mobile users. "Celebrity Bromance" portrays  star friendships, and is filmed the "paparazzi - style" from a distance to allow the cast members to feel less overwhelmed by cameras. The episodes are available on Naver TVCast and YouTube on every Tuesday on 11 PM KST.

The program premiered on February 4, 2016, with the singer and actor V and actor Kim Min-jae .

Cast members 
 Season 1 – 
 V (BTS) & Kim Min-Jae
 Season 2 – 
 Zico (Block B) & Choi Tae-joon
 Season 3 – 
 Kim Ryeowook (Super Junior) & Park Hyung-sik (ZE:A)
 Season 4 – 
 Ji Soo & Nam Joo-hyuk
 Season 5 – 
 Jackson (GOT7) & Jooheon (Monsta X)
 Season 6 – 
 L (INFINITE) & Kim Min Seok
 Season 7 – 
 N (VIXX) & Lee Won-keun
 Season 8 – 
 Jungkook (BTS) & Lee Minwoo (Shinhwa)
 Season 9 – 
 Jung Joon-young & Roy Kim
 Chuseok Special – 
 Jackson (GOT7) & Ahn Hyo-seop
 Season 10 – 
 Park Kyung (Block B) & Kim Ji-seok
 Season 11 – 
 Gongchan (B1A4) & Hongbin (VIXX)
 Season 12 – 
 JB (GOT7) & YoungJae (B.A.P)
 Season 13 – 
 Sungjae (BTOB) & Youngmin, Kwangmin (BOYFRIEND)
 Season 14 – 
 Son Dong-woon (Highlight) & Lee Gi-kwang (Highlight)

List of episodes

2016

2017

References 

South Korean variety television shows
Korean-language television shows
MBC TV original programming